Dannie Heineman Prize may refer to:

Dannie Heineman Prize for Astrophysics, awarded by the American Astronomical Society and American Institute of Physics
Dannie Heineman Prize for Mathematical Physics, awarded by the American Physical Society and American Institute of Physics
Dannie Heineman Prize (Göttingen), awarded by the Göttingen Academy of Sciences and Humanities